Asian Highway 5 (AH5) is an east-west route of the Asian Highway Network, running 10,380 km (6,450 miles) from Shanghai, China via Kazakhstan, Kyrgyzstan, Uzbekistan,  Turkmenistan, Azerbaijan, Georgia to the border between Turkey and Bulgaria west of Istanbul where it connects to AH1 and E80.

China 

4,815 km
 : Shanghai - Wuxi - Nanjing
 : Nanjing - Hefei - Lu'an - Huangchuan - Xinyang - Nanyang - Xixia - Lantian Baqiao - Xi'an
 : Xi'an - Baoji - Tianshui - Dingxi - Lanzhou - Wuwei - Zhangye - Jiayuguan - Guazhou - Kumul - Turfan - Turfan - Ürümqi - Kuytun - Khorgas

Kazakhstan 
: Khorgos - Koktal - Shonzhy - Almaty - Kaskelen - Kenen
 (Branch): Kenen - Korday - Border of Kyrgyzstan

Kyrgyzstan 
  ЭМ-01 Road: Border of Kazakhstan - Bishkek
  ЭМ-02 Road: Bishkek Bypass
  ЭМ-04 Road: Bishkek - Kara-Balta
  ЭМ-03 Road: Kara-Balta - Chaldovar

Kazakhstan
 :Chaldovar -  Merke
: Merke - Taraz - Shymkent - Zhibek Zholy

Uzbekistan 
677 km
: Border of Kazakhstan - G‘ishtko‘prik - Tashkent - Chinoz - Sirdaryo
: Sirdaryo - Oqoltin
: Oqoltin - Sardoba
: Sardoba - Jizzax - Samarkand
: Samarkand - Navoi - Bukhara - Olot - Border of Turkmenistan

Turkmenistan 
1227 km
 Farap - Turkmenabat - Mary  - Tejen - Ashgabat - Serdar - Turkmenbashi

Gap
Caspian Sea

Azerbaijan 
515 km
  M2 Highway: Baku - Alat - Gazi Mammed - Ganja - Qazax - Qirmizi Korpu

Georgia 
489 km
 : Red Bridge - Rustavi
 : Rustavi - Tbilisi
 : Tbilisi - Senaki
 : Senaki - Poti - Batumi - Sarpi

Turkey 
960 km
 : Sarp - Trabzon - Samsun
 : Samsun - Merzifon
 : Merzifon - Gerede
 : Gerede - Istanbul
 : Istanbul
 : Istanbul - Edirne - Kapikule

References

Asian Highway Network
Roads in China
Roads in Kazakhstan
Roads in Uzbekistan
Roads in Turkmenistan
Roads in Azerbaijan
Roads in Georgia (country)
Roads in Turkey